Heteroclinus roseus, the Rosy weedfish, is a species of clinid native to the Pacific Ocean coasts around Japan, Australia and Polynesia where it lives in coastal belts of seaweed.  This species can reach a maximum length of  TL.

References

roseus
Taxa named by Albert Günther 
Fish described in 1861